Oscar Prieto may refer to:

Oscar Prieto Ortiz (1905–1983), Venezuelan baseball executive and promoter
Óscar Vargas Prieto (1917–1989), Peruvian soldier and politician